Southwest Minzu University, formerly Southwest University for Nationalities (SWUN), is a multi-disciplinary higher education institute under the control of the State Ethnic Affairs Commission of China. The university was founded in July 1950 and officially established on June 1, 1951.

Campuses
The university is in Chengdu and is in adjacent to the famous Wuhou Temple. It covers an area of over 3000 mu with 1120,000 square meters for construction area, over three campuses.

Its main campus is in Wuhou District, in the southwestern section of the 1st ring road encircling central Chengdu. The university has two other campuses: One is in Shuangliu county, near the airport; the Taipingyuan campus is outside the second ring road.

In addition the university maintains the Qinghai-Tibetan Plateau Ecological Environmental Protection and Advanced Technology for Animal Husbandry in Hongyuan County, Ngawa Tibetan and Qiang Autonomous Prefecture.

Academics
 Colleges and Programs

References

External links

Universities and colleges in Chengdu
Minzu Universities